Philippine asado refers to two different Filipino braised meat dishes. The name originates from Spanish asado ("grilled"), a reference to the original dish it was applied to, the Chinese-Filipino version of char siu barbecues usually known as pork asado. However, the Filipino versions have evolved to be braised, not grilled. The other Filipino dish also known as asado is asado de carajay. Unlike the Chinese-derived version, it is savory rather than sweet.

Variations

Asado de carajay
Asado de carajay is a native asado. The name is derived from Philippine Spanish carajay ("wok", kawali or kalaha in Philippine languages). Asado de carajay is made with meat (pork, beef, or chicken) braised in soy sauce, bay leaves, peppercorns, calamansi, onions, and various vegetables (usually tomatoes, potatoes, mushrooms, and carrots). It is traditionally cooked in a wok, hence the name.

Asado de carajay is differentiated from the "Chinese-style" pork asado in the use of vegetables, the absence of Chinese spices, and its savory flavor. It is also not restricted to pork, but can be cooked with beef or chicken.

Pork asado

Pork asado, also known as "Chinese" asado or "Chinese-style" asado, is the variant most commonly associated with the name asado. It is derived from the Chinese dish char siu, and possibly also influenced by the Hokkien dish tau yew bak. Unlike char siu however, the dish is always braised, not grilled or roasted. The dish is made with pork braised in soy sauce, garlic, bay leaves, onion, brown sugar, and various Chinese spices (usually star anise and five spice). It is very similar to humba and pata tim, which also originate from Chinese-Filipino migrants. It also resembles hamonado, because of its sweetness, though hamonado uses pineapples and is a native dish.

Pork asado is usually sliced thinly and served with the braising liquid. Pork asado is also commonly shredded and used as fillings for sandwiches and buns. It is also the primary filling of the Filipino siopao, which is also known as siopao asado.

A variant of pork asado is the "Macau-style" pork asado. It uses the same ingredients but differs primarily in that the meat isn't broiled beforehand, but rather it is boiled directly in the marinade until tender.

See also

Humba
Pata tim
Chicken karahi - An Indian meat and vegetable curry named after and braised in a wok (karahi in Indian languages). A possible origin for this dish
Cuisine of the Philippines
 List of Philippine dishes

References

External links

Philippine pork dishes